Say Phouthang (d. 2016) was a Cambodian politician and a leader during the People's Republic of Kampuchea.

References

2016 deaths
Year of birth missing
Cambodian politicians
Cambodian people of Thai descent